is the second Jewelpet anime series created by Sanrio and Sega and animated by Studio Comet, announced in Shogakukan's Pucchigumi magazine and directed by Takashi Yamamoto. The series first aired on April 3, 2010 to April 2, 2011 on TV Tokyo and TV Osaka. The series premiered later in Spain as part of the Boing programming block. Jewelpet Twinkle is the first series to have critical appeal outside the series' target demographic, particularly in the dōjin community due to the character designs and series's story plot.

The series focuses on Akari Sakura, who first met Ruby on the beach on her way to school. At first, Akari cannot understand her due to her Jewel Land language, but Ruby eats a special candy so she can speak and understand human language. As the day passes, Ruby knows about her problems in school and later apologized, saying that she did not know Akari's personal problems as she tries to cheer her up. Later, a Jewel Charm appears on her hand and Akari realizes that she was chosen by Ruby to be her partner. After that, she decides to become a student in Jewel Land along with Ruby as they are aiming to collect 12 Jewel Stones get into the Jewel Star Grand Prix.

The series' music is composed by famous Video Game Composer Shiro Hamaguchi like the first series. Two songs were made for both the Opening and Ending themes of the series. The ending theme titled  by Natsumi Takamori, Ayana Taketatsu and Azusa Kataoka as Akari, Miria and Sara.

Nippon Columbia publishes several DVD volumes of Jewelpet Twinkle during the series's airing. Frontier Works also released the series as a DVD Box set on July 22, 2011. "Fan Discs" were also released due to the show's popularity in Comiket, each containing some episodes and bonus extras. The first was released on September 9, 2011, Fan Disc F, which includes a special version of the Opening Video of the anime, was released on January 16, 2012 and a Blu-ray fan disc that contains a special song titled  was released on September 9, 2012, with a Limited Edition released on August 10, 2012. A Blu-ray box set was released on July 21, 2013, which includes an OVA episode, a second official soundtrack, and an illustration booklet containing official illustrations and promotional images from the series.

Episode list

References

http://www.tv-tokyo.co.jp/anime/jewelpet2/

Twinkle